Marcello De Cecco (17 September 1939 – 3 March 2016) was an Italian economist.

Born in Lanciano, De Cecco graduated in Law at the Parma University and later in Economics at the University of Cambridge. He was professor in several universities, including the Scuola Normale Superiore di Pisa and the LUISS University of Rome.

De Cecco's studies mainly focused on the history of monetary and financial policies and on the theories of the genesis and the functioning of markets. Close to Keynesian economics theories, he was increasingly concerned with the European Union issues, of which he strongly opposed the European austerity politics.

De Cecco collaborated with several financial institutions, including the International Monetary Fund, Banca d'Italia and Banca Nazionale del Lavoro. In 2007 he was part of the Organizing Committee of the Democratic Party.

References

External links 
 Marcello De Cecco at the Institute for New Economic Thinking

1939 births
2016 deaths
20th-century  Italian economists
University of Parma alumni
Alumni of the University of Cambridge
Italian essayists
Male essayists
20th-century essayists
Academic staff of the University of Pisa
Academic staff of the Libera Università Internazionale degli Studi Sociali Guido Carli
Keynesians
Italian male non-fiction writers
21st-century  Italian economists